Mustang! is a 1959 American Western film directed by Tom Gries and starring Jack Buetel The film was made in 1955, when Champ Butler recorded the film's theme tune.

Plot
In the hills and forest surrounding a horse-breeding ranch, an unbroken wild mustang has been a constant challenge to the ranch owner. To keep the animal from getting killed for being untamed, the ranch owner's son and daughter decide to try and see if they can get and win the trust of the mustang together.

Cast
 Jack Buetel as Gable (as Jack Beutel)
 Madalyn Trahey as Nancy
 Stephen Keyes as Lou, Ranch Hand (as Steve Keyes)
 Milt Swift as Ranch Owner
 Bob Gilbert as Cowhand (as Robert Gilbert)
 Paul Spahn as Cowhand 
 Max M. Gilford as Ranch Hand 
 Autumn Moon as The Wild Mustang

See also
 List of American films of 1959

References

External links
 
 
 

1959 films
1959 Western (genre) films
American Western (genre) films
United Artists films
Films directed by Tom Gries
Films about horses
Films scored by Raoul Kraushaar
1950s English-language films